This is a list of university networks, showing formalized cooperations among institutions of tertiary education.

Global Networks
Matariki Network of Universities
McDonnell International Scholars Academy
 Universitas 21
 World Universities Congress
 Worldwide Universities Network

Regional Networks
 Association of Pacific Rim Universities
 Aurora (university network)
 ASEAN University Network
 Balkan Universities Network 
 Black Sea Universities Network
 Compostela Group of Universities
 Euroleague for Life Sciences
 EUROSCI Network
 Mediterranean Universities Union
 University Network of the European Capitals of Culture
 Utrecht Network
 Vives University Network
 Young European Research University Network

University Networks